DrugScience or Drug Science (originally called the Independent Scientific Committee on Drugs (ISCD)) is a UK-based drugs advisory committee proposed and initially funded by hedge fund manager Toby Jackson. It is chaired by Professor David Nutt and was officially launched on 15 January 2010 with the help of the Centre for Crime and Justice Studies. The primary aim of the committee is to review and investigate the scientific evidence of drug harms without the political interference that could result from government affiliation.

The establishment of the committee followed the controversial sacking of Professor Nutt, on 30 October 2009 as chair of the UK's statutory Advisory Council on the Misuse of Drugs by UK Home Secretary, Alan Johnson after the Equasy controversy. The controversy followed his Eve Saville Memorial Lecture (2009) at the Centre.

DrugScience initially focused on reviewing official risk estimates for psychedelic drugs, ecstasy and cannabis, and increasing warnings of the dangers of ketamine. In 2013, DrugScience launched the peer-review academic journal Drug Science, Policy and Law published by SAGE. They currently have three working groups Medical Cannabis, Medical Psychedelics, and Enhanced Harm Reduction.

Drug harm comparison 
In 2010, DrugScience produced a ranking of drug harms in the UK, the results of which garnered significant media attention. Drugs were assessed on two metrics – harm to users and harms to society. The report found heroin, crack cocaine, and methamphetamine to be the most harmful drugs to individuals, with alcohol, heroin, and crack cocaine as the most harmful to others. Overall, alcohol was the most harmful drug, with heroin and crack cocaine in second and third places. Most notably, it found the legal status of most drugs bears little relation to the harms associated with them – several class A drugs including ecstasy (MDMA), LSD and magic mushrooms featured at the very bottom of the list. Similar findings were found by a Europe-wide study conducted by 40 drug experts in 2015  Since then drug ranking by total harm research has come to the same conclusion.

Methods used in drug harm comparison

The results in the study was generated by the opinions and the judgment of existing knowledge of 15 researchers, doctors, and a journalist. These opinions were exchanged and discussed during a 1-day workshop in accordance to a decision-making procedure called Multi-Criteria-Decision-Making-Analysis (MCDA). This procedure attempts to structure the debate so as to eliminate biases, but given that it has no other input than the experience and knowledge of the participants involved it is unlikely to be unbiased if the participants share a similar understanding of a subject, or if the science in the field is inadequate to make a good judgment.

E-cigarette analysis 
Using a similar multi-criteria decision analysis process as the 2010 drug harm ranking, DrugScience looked to rank the harms of all nicotine-containing products, including cigarettes, cigars, nicotine patches and e-cigarettes. The report concluded that e-cigarettes are 95% less harmful than conventional cigarettes, advice which was subsequently used in a report by Public Health England on e-cigarettes and now forms part of the evidence-base for the positions of the UK Government and the National Health Service. This figure was widely reported on in the press, but remains controversial as the long-term harms of e-cigarettes remain unknown. More recent systematic reviews suggest that e-cigarettes are considerably less harmful than cigarettes, but that the difference may be smaller than previously estimated.

Drugs Live

Drugs Live: the ecstasy trial is a two-part TV documentary aired on Channel 4 on the 26 and 27 September 2012. The program showed an fMRI study on the effects of MDMA (ecstasy) on the brain, which was funded by Channel 4. The main researchers on the study were DrugScience's Val Curran and David Nutt who also appeared as guests on the show. Curran and Nutt oversaw research at Imperial College London, in which volunteers took part in a double blind study, taking either 83 mg of MDMA or a placebo before going into the fMRI scanner.

The documentary was presented by Christian Jessen and Jon Snow, and included debate on the harms of MDMA, as well as exhibiting the findings of the study. Some participants in the study also appeared on the show, including a vicar, an ex-soldier, writer Lionel Shriver, actor Keith Allen and former Liberal Democrat MP Evan Harris.

Nutt and colleagues have said they are preparing to run the UK's first clinical trial of MDMA-assisted psychotherapy for the treatment of PTSD, based on the research from the study.

DrugScience publications

See also
Drug Control Law: Criticism

References

Research institutes in London
Drugs in the United Kingdom